Pommac is the brand name for a carbonated soft drink made by Carlsberg Sverige AB of fruits and berries and matured in oak barrels for three months. The name comes from "Pommery", referring to Champagne, and Cognac, as it is matured in oak barrels like wine. Another theory of the naming is the French word pomace, which literally means remains of pressed fruits. See also Ripasso.

The recipe is kept a secret.

In 1919, after his best efforts to keep his brewery running Anders Lindahl moved to Stockholm, Sweden as a failed businessman, and founded Fructus Fabriker and began to make Pommac. The recipe was made by a Finland-Swedish inventor. The drink was made for the upper classes as an alcohol-free substitute for wine.

Dr Pepper distributed a formulation of it in the US as a diet drink from 1963 to 1969 in six-and-a-half- and ten-ounce bottles. It took a while for people to become accustomed to the taste, so sales were slow. When sales remained stagnant after six years, and its sweetener, sodium cyclamate, was banned, Dr Pepper discontinued the product.. The original however had always used sugar as its sweetener.

Pommac is also served as a non-alcoholic champagne alternative on festive occasions. 
 
In late 2004, Carlsberg in Denmark announced that they were going to cease production of Pommac for financial reasons. However, after overwhelming public demand (including a petition tallying over 50,000 signatures) were raised in response, the company decided to keep marketing Pommac.

See also
 Champis

References

External links

 Carlsberg Sverige Pommac
 Hartwall
pommac light
 pommac classic

Fruit sodas
Finnish drinks
Swedish drinks